Letters and Science are granite sculptures created by Charles Keck, installed at Columbia University's main entrance, at the intersection of Broadway and 116th Street, in New York City. They were created in 1915 and 1925, respectively. Letters depicts a woman holding a book across her chest; Science depicts a male figure holding a compass and globe.

See also

 1915 in art
 1925 in art

References

1915 establishments in New York City
1915 sculptures
1925 establishments in New York City
1925 sculptures
Books in art
Columbia University campus
Granite sculptures in New York City
Maps in art
Outdoor sculptures in Manhattan
Sculptures by Charles Keck
Sculptures of men in New York City
Sculptures of women in New York City